Myelobia smerintha is a moth in the family Crambidae. It is found in Argentina.

References

Chiloini